PontAuRail is a voluntary association created in 1995 to run trains between Pont-Audemer and Honfleur in France. The group comprises approximately fifty voluntary members, of which twenty are active.
An agreement, une convention signée, allows PontAuRail to use the line between Pont-Audemer and Honfleur on request on Saturdays, Sundays and Bank holidays.

The trip along the Risle valley lasts fifty-five minutes, including manoeuvers; closing of the semi-automatic level crossings in Pont-Audemer and shunting in Honfleur.

Rolling stock

PontauRail operates with two French Diesel multiple units, X2426 and X4555.

 Railcar X2426 was officially decommissioned on 27 September 1987 in Limoges. Saved from scrapping, it became the property of the Train Touristique du Cotentin until 1995 when it was purchased by the Risle Seine SIVOM to create pleasure railway service between Pont-Audemer and Honfleur. It remained parked in Gare de Carentan for a long time and then was vandalised in Gare de Pont-Audemer. It was then restored carefully and repainted in its original livery. The X2426 is now the property of PontAuRail following the dismantling of the SIVOM.
 DMU X4555 was entrusted to PontAuRail by the SNCF in 2004. The X4555 was built in 1965 and allocated to Lyon Vaise on 10 November 1965. It was then moved to Nevers on 23 May 1971 then to Marseille on 9 June 1971 and finally to Longueau on 30 September 1982. It was then decommissioned in September 2003. It ran services in 2005 in replacement of the X2426, which is less powerful than the X4555.

Stations
Pont-Audemer
Toutainville
Saint-Maclou
Beuzeville
Quetteville
La Rivière Saint-Sauveur
Honfleur

External links
 PontAuRail

Pontaurail
Pontaurail
Transport in Normandy
Tourist attractions in Calvados (department)